Gulzar Singh Ranike was a cabinet minister in the previous Punjab government and he belongs to the ruling Shiromani Akali Dal. He was Minister for Animal Husbandry, Dairy, Fisheries in that Government. He had been holding this post from 2012 to 2017. He is also President of Shiromani Akali Dal SC Wing.

Personal life
He was born into Mazhabi Sikh family and his father was also a leader in Akali Dal.

Political career
He started his political career in 1983 as a Sarpanch (Village chief) of Ranike. He was first elected for the Punjab Legislative Assembly in 1997 as an Akali Dal candidate from Attari.
He was again re-elected in 2002, 2007 and 2012. In 2007 he was made Minister of Animal Husbandry, Dairy, Fisheries, Welfare of SCs and BCs, Sports & Youth Services. After 2012, he continued to be minister of Animal Husbandry, Dairy, Fisheries, Welfare of SC & BC, whereas portfolio of Sports & Youth Services was transferred to deputy Chief Minister Sukhbir Singh Badal.

References

Shiromani Akali Dal politicians
State cabinet ministers of Punjab, India
Living people
Indian Sikhs
Punjab, India MLAs 1997–2002
Punjab, India MLAs 2002–2007
Punjab, India MLAs 2007–2012
Punjab, India MLAs 2012–2017
1958 births
Politicians from Amritsar